Mateo Vakatalau Malupo (born 7 July 1988) is a Tongan rugby union player. He plays wing for Tonga on international level. Malupo also plays for Olimpia București in their SuperLiga campaign.

References

External links
itsrugby.co.uk Profile
espnscrum.com Profile

1988 births
Living people
Northland rugby union players
CSM București (rugby union) players
Tonga international rugby union players
Rugby union fullbacks